Arbaa Taourirt is a small town and rural commune in Al Hoceïma Province of the Tanger-Tétouan-Al Hoceima region of Morocco. According to the 2014 census, the commune had a total population of 5187 people living in 985 households. The town holds a weekly market every Wednesday. It is best known for the historic site of Kelaat Arbaa Taourirt, also known as Fousina, a castle erected in the 1940s by Spanish colonial authorities. Several families have emigrated to European countries.

References

Populated places in Al Hoceïma Province
Rural communes of Tanger-Tetouan-Al Hoceima